BBMG Corporation Ltd. is a cement producer and property developer headquartered in Beijing, China. It is the largest supplier of building materials in Beijing, Tianjin and Hebei province.

BBMG Corporation Ltd. is a state-controlled enterprise, with the majority shareholder being BBMG Group with a 45% stake (as of end 2010). BBMG Group Company Ltd is a wholly state-owned enterprise administrated  by  the  State-owned  Assets  Supervision  and  Administration  Commission  of  the  Beijing  Municipal  Government.

It was listed on the Hong Kong Stock Exchange in 2009 with the IPO price of HK$6.38 per share. It mainly attracted five cornerstone investors: China Investment Corporation, China Life Insurance, Bank of China Investment Group, Och-Ziff hedge fund and Robert Kuok of the Kerry Group.

References

External links
BBMG Corporation
BBMG.COM
BBMG.CO.UK

Companies listed on the Hong Kong Stock Exchange
Companies listed on the Shanghai Stock Exchange
Companies based in Beijing
Real estate companies established in 1996
Construction and civil engineering companies established in 1996
Companies owned by the provincial government of China
Construction and civil engineering companies of China
Cement companies of China
Chinese brands
Real estate companies of China
H shares
Chinese companies established in 1996
1996 establishments in China